Cherie is an English female given name. It comes from the French chérie, meaning darling (from the past participle of the verb chérir, to cherish). 

Notable people with the name or stage name include:
 Cherie, one of the stage names of French singer Cyndi Almouzni (born 1984)
 Cherie Bambury (born 1976), Australian cricket player
 Cherie Bennett (born 1960), American novelist, actress, director, playwright, newspaper columnist, singer and television writer
 Cherie Berry (born 1946), American politician from North Carolina
 Cherie Blair (born 1954), known professionally as Cherie Booth, British barrister, wife of former prime minister Tony Blair
 Cherie Buckner-Webb (born 1951), American politician from Idaho
 Cherie Burton (born 1968), Australian politician
 Cherie Chung (born 1960), Hong Kong film actress
 Cherie Currie (born 1959), American musician, singer, songwriter, actress and artist
 Cherie de Boer (born 1950), accordionist, half of the Dutch duo Accordéon Mélancolique
 Cherie DeCastro (1922–2010), one of The DeCastro Sisters, a female singing trio
 Cherie Dimaline (born 1975), Canadian Métis writer
 Cherie Ditcham (born 1981), Australian actress and model
 Cherie Gallagher (born 1982), Australian basketball player
 Cherie Gardiner (born 1991), 2009 Miss Northern Ireland
 Cherie Gil (born 1963), Filipino actress
 Cherie Hausler (born 1973), Australian television presenter, journalist, food stylist and creative director 
 Cherie Johnson (born 1975), American film and television actress
 Cherie Kagan (born 1969), American professor in nanotechnology
 Cherie Kluesing (died 1989), American landscape architect, designer, and educator
 Cherie Lash Rhoades, Northern Paiute tribe member in California, perpetrator of a 2014 shooting
 Cherie Lunghi (born 1952), English film, television and theatre actress
 Cherie Mercado, Filipina broadcast journalist
 Cherie Nowlan, Australian film and television director
 Cherie Piper (born 1981), Canadian ice hockey player 
 Cherie Priest (born 1975), American novelist and blogger
 Cherie Roberts (born 1978), American model and photographer
 Cherie Templer (1856–1915), New Zealand painter
 Cherie Wilkerson, American writer
 Cherie Witter (born 1963), American model and Playboy Playmate

See also
 Chérie Carter-Scott
 Cherie (disambiguation)
 Cherie Amie, American retailer
 Chéri (disambiguation) (includes Cheri)
 Sherri (name)